The Ogdensburg Maples was the final moniker of the minor league baseball teams based in Ogdensburg, New York. Between 1900 and 1940, earlier Ogdensburg teams played as members of the Northern New York League in 1900 and 1901 and the Canadian–American League from 1936 to 1940. The Maples played as members of the Class C level Border League from 1946 to 1951. Overall, Ogdensburg teams won three league championships and one pennant. The Maples hosted home games at Winter Park.

Ogdensburg teams played as a minor league affiliate of the Philadelphia Phillies in 1940 and New York Giants in 1948.

History

Northern New York League 1900–1901
Minor league baseball started in Ogdensburg, New York in 1900. The Ogdensburg team was a charter member of the five–team Independent level Northern New York League. Ogdensburg finished 4–14 and placed 5th in the 1900 Northern New York League, playing under manager S.H Cook. The Ogdensburg franchise folded from the league after the 1901 season.

Canadian–American League 1936–1940
The Ogdensburg Colts became charter members of the 1936 Class C level Canadian–American League. The 1936 final league standings featured the Brockville Pirates (43–36), Ogdensburg Colts (38–45), Oswego Netherlands (32–51), Ottawa Senators (53–37), Perth Blue Cats/Royals (50–30) and Watertown Grays/Massena Bucks (35–52). The 1936 Ogdensburg Colts finished with a Canadian-American League regular season record of 38–45. Their 4th-place finish in the CCL under managers George Lee and Bernard Fasulo qualified the team for the playoffs. In the 1936 playoffs, the Perth Blue Cats/Royals defeated the Ogdensburg Colts 3 games to 2.

The 1937 Ogdensburg Colts were the Canadian-American League Champions. The Colts ended the season with a record of 55–47, placing 4th in the Canadian-American League regular season. On August 21, 1937, Colts pitcher Leo Pukas threw a no–hitter in a 9–0 victory over the Ottawa Braves. Playing under manager George Lee, the Ogdensburg Colts defeated the Oswego Netherlands 3 games 1 in the playoff semi–final. In the league Finals, the Ogdensburg Colts and Gloversville Glovers played to a seven–game series, with the cColts winning 4 games to 3. The Colts' season attendance was 27,827, an average of 546 per home game.

In the 1938 season, the Ogdensburg Colts finished 3rd in the Canadian-American League regular season standings. Ogdensburg finished with a record of 66–52, playing under manager George Lee. On September 5, 1938, Ogdensburg pitcher Ed Lauer threw a perfect game in a 7–inning game, as Lauer and the Colts defeated the Ottawa Braves 7–0. In the 1938 Playoffs, the Cornwall Bisons swept the Ogdensburg Colts 4 games to 0. The 1938 Colts' season attendance was 27,016, an average of 458.

The 1939 season was the final one for Ogdensburg under the "Colts" moniker. Ogdensburg finished with a record of 60–58, placing 5th in the Canadian-American League regular season standings. Their manager was again George Lee. The 1939 Attendance was 19,849, an average of 336. The Ogdensburg Colts franchise folded after the 1939 season.

In 1940, Ogdensburg partnered with Ottawa, Ontario in creating a franchise that played home games both cities. The Ottawa-Ogdensburg Senators won the 1940 Canadian-American League pennant. The Ottawa Senators franchise played half their 1940 Canadian-American League season in Ogdensburg. The team was an affiliate of the Philadelphia Phillies. Under manager Cy Morgan, the Senators finished with a 84–39 record, placing 1st in the regular season standings. In the 1940 Playoffs, the Amsterdam Rugmakers defeated the Ottawa-Ogdensburg Senators 4 games to 1. Neither Ottawa or Ogdensburg fielded a team in 1941.

Border League 1946–1951
Minor league baseball returned when the 1946 Ogdensburg Maples became charter members of the Class C level Border League. The 1946 six–team league standings featured the Auburn Cayugas (72–44), Granby Red Sox (54–60), Kingston Ponies (58–55), Ogdensburg Maples (50–68), Sherbrooke Canadians (46–71) and Watertown Athletics (69–51) In their initial season, the 1946 Ogdensburg Maples finished with a record of 50–68, placing 5th in the Border League standings. Led by manager Bobby Dill, the Maples did not qualify for the playoffs. Resuming play at Winter Park, the 1946 season home attendance was 28,395, an average of 481 per contest.

The Ogdensburg Maples reached the Border League Finals in 1947. Finishing the regular season at 61–65, placing 4th in the Border League, manager Steve Yerkes led the Maples to the playoffs. In the 1947 playoffs, the Ogdensburg Maples advanced by defeating the Watertown Athletics in a seven-game series 4 games to 3. In the Finals, the Ottawa Nationals defeated the Ogdensburg Maples  4 games 2. Ogdensburg's season attendance was 63,486, an average of 1,008.

The 1948 Ogdensburg Maples won the Border League championship. Playing as an affiliate of the New York Giants, the Maples finished the regular season with a record of 69–60, placing 3rd in the standings, playing under manager Russ Wein. In the playoffs, the Ogdensburg Maples advanced by defeating the Ottawa Senators 4 games to 1. In the 1948 Finals, the Ogdensburg Maples won the championship by sweeping the Watertown Athletics 4 games to 0. The Maples season attendance was 60,116.

The Ogdensburg Maples again advanced to the Border League playoffs in 1949. Finishing in 3rd place with a regular season record of 70–60, the team was again managed by Russ Wein. The Maples lost in the playoffs, defeated by the Geneva Robins 4 games to 3. The season attendance was 58,749.

The 1950 Ogdensburg Maples won their second Border League Championship. After a 2nd place 74–54 finish under manager Russ Wein, the Maples qualified for the playoffs. In the 1950 playoffs, the Ogdensburg Maples advanced to the Finals by defeating the Watertown Athletics 4 games to 1. In the Finals, the Ogdensburg Maples won the championship by defeating the Ottawa Senators 4 games to 2. The 1950 Maples season attendance was 55,291, an average of 864 per game.

The Border League folded during the 1951 season. Managed by John Sosh and Irvin Schupp, the Ogdensburg Maples had a record of 29–35, and were in 2nd place when the Border League permanently disbanded on July 16, 1951.

Ogdensburg has not hosted another minor league baseball team after the 1951 Ogdensburg Maples and the Border League folded.

The ballpark
The Ogdensburg Colts and Ogdensburg Maples teams were both noted to have played minor league home games at Winter Park. The site had previously hosted a skating rink. The dimensions were (left–center–right) 260–450–386. The ballpark seated 1,800 and had no lights when hosting the Colts. Lighting was installed by the Ogdensburg Maples. The ballpark grandstand once collapsed during a game. Today, the park has been renamed to "Father Martin Field." Still in use, the ballpark is located next to the Knights of Columbus at 721 Hasbrouck Street, Ogdensburg, New York.

Notable alumni

Merle Anthony (1946)
Joe Camacho (1949)
Frank Fanovich (1946)
Jim Galvin (1938)
Dixie Howell (1940) College Football Hall of Fame (1970)
George Jumonville (1940)
Olav Kollevoll (1946)
Ken Jungels (1949)
Garland Lawing (1948)
George Lee (1937–1939, MGR)  Canadian Baseball Hall of Fame (1998)
Jake Livingstone (1901)
Hal Marnie (1940)
Paul Masterson (1940)
Bill Peterman (1940)
Johnny Podgajny (1940)
Doc Scanlan (1901)
Lou Sleater (1947–1948)
Maurice Van Robays (1937)
Steve Yerkes (1947, MGR)

See also
Ogdensburg Maples players

References

External links
Baseball Reference

Defunct minor league baseball teams
Philadelphia Phillies minor league affiliates
Defunct baseball teams in New York (state)
New York Giants minor league affiliates
San Francisco Giants minor league affiliates
St. Lawrence County, New York
Baseball teams disestablished in 1951
Baseball teams established in 1946
Border League teams